White space or whitespace may refer to:

Technology
 Whitespace characters, characters in computing that represent horizontal or vertical space
 White spaces (radio), allocated but locally unused radio frequencies
 TV White Space Database, a mechanism to enable utilization of the allocated but locally unused radio frequencies
 Whitespace (programming language), an esoteric programming language

Other uses
 White space (visual arts), portions of a page layout or image left unmarked
Negative space, portions of a page layout or image deliberately left unmarked and used as a component
 Space (punctuation), the space between two words of text
 The White Space, a 2009 drama film
 White Space, a two-book science fiction series by Elizabeth Bear
 A location in the video game OMORI

See also
 Space (disambiguation)
 White room (disambiguation)